Xie (Chinese: , Xiè) was the tenth king of the semi-legendary Xia Dynasty. The son of Mang, Xie ascended the throne in the "Xinwei" year. He possibly ruled 25 years.

According to the Bamboo Annals, in the 12th year of Xie's reign, the prince of Yin (殷), Zihai (子亥), while a guest in Youyi (有易), was "guilty of licentious conduct" and killed by the leader of the place, Mianchen (綿臣), who also sent away his retinue. Four years later, Zihai’s successor, Wei (微), allied with the forces of the baron of Ho (河伯), and invaded Youyi, killing Mianchen.

In the 21st year of his reign, Xie "conferred regular dignities" on the chiefs of the surrounding barbarians.

He was succeeded by his sons Bu Jiang and Jiong.

See also 
 Family tree of ancient Chinese emperors

Notes 

Xia dynasty kings